Aria of the Devil is the second of two studio albums by Theatre of Hate issued posthumously after the band's dissolution in 1983. It was released in 1998 by Original Masters/Snapper Music

Track listing
All songs written by Kirk Brandon.

 "Ovature" - 3:14
 "Aria of the Devil" - 4:18
 "Dreams of the Poppy" - 4:03
 "Omen of the Times" - 3:12
 "The Incinerator" - 4:07
 "Nero" - 5:10
 "Americanos" - 3:51
 "Eastworld" - 3:29
 "The Black Madonna" - 3:24
 "Solution" - 3:35

Personnel
Theatre of Hate
 Kirk Brandon – vocals, guitar
 Stan Stammers – bass guitar
 Nigel Preston – drums
Technical
Mick Jones - recording, production

References
Aria of the Devil - SMM CD 527 (1998)

1998 albums
Theatre of Hate albums